LA Freewaves, also known as Freewaves, is a Los Angeles-based nonprofit organization that advocates for, and exhibits, new, uncensored, independent media. It hosts an online media archive as a resource to facilitate the exchange of media art internationally. Anne Bray, with representatives of other communities, founded LA Freewaves in 1989 and she has worked to administer the non-profit since it was launched at the American Film Institute's National Video Festival. Bray serves as director of the festival and has been working in the field of media arts for many years as an artist and teacher.

Freewaves holds the biennial L.A. Freewaves Festival, which presents independent and experimental media in venues throughout Los Angeles and hosts a variety of speakers on the topics of education, art, technology, and media. The California Institute of the Arts described the festival as "The internationally renowned festival of independent film, video and new media." It has also been described as an "important voice for social justice and change in L.A.", and "the largest theatrical exhibition of alternative video in the greater Los Angeles area".

Festival
Freewaves was launched at the American Film Institute's National Video Festival in 1989. In 2004, the festival expanded to include international submissions.

Freewaves typically features independent and experimental media, and exhibits a resistance to corporate capitalism. Along with static installations, the largest of which show at the Museum of Contemporary Art, they present road shows that travel throughout the state of California; they also broadcast on cable television, and on the internet. Media artists including Bill Viola, William Basinski, Yes Men, Brad Neely, CrimethInc. and Jennifer Steinkamp have shown works in Freewaves programs. The organization also presents specialized versions of its festival, for example, festivals that focus on Latin America.

In 2000, Freewaves hosted Air Raids, a citywide festival of experimental, documentary and new media works by artists, activists and media makers. The festival featured an opening at the Museum of Contemporary Art, Los Angeles, thematic video bus tours, "TV or Not TV" a 10-year LA media arts retrospective that aired on KCET, online exhibitions, as well as screenings and installations at multiple Southern California venues.

The ninth festival, How Can You Resist? was held in 2004, with over 150 works of video, film and digital media chosen to address the question "How Can You Resist?"

References

External links
Freewaves Official Website

Experimental film
1989 establishments in California
Experimental film festivals
Organizations established in 1989
Organizations based in Los Angeles